Marius Swart (194117 January 2021) was a South African politician and businessman. A member of the Democratic Alliance, he served as the inaugural Executive Mayor of the George Local Municipality from 2000 to 2004, when he was elected to the National Assembly. After serving two terms in parliament, Swart retired from politics in 2014.

Early life and education
Swart was born in Swellendam in the Cape Province in 1941. He completed most of his school career in Kimberley before he matriculated at Voortrekker High School in Bethlehem in the Orange Free State in 1958. In 1965, Swart graduated from the University of Stellenbosch with a Bachelor of Arts in Business Economics and Psychology. After university, he worked in the corporate sector before he became the company director of Bolton Footwear. Swart later started his own business.

Political career
Swart joined the newly formed Democratic Alliance and stood as their mayoral candidate for the newly established George Local Municipality in the 2000 municipal elections. After the election, the council elected him as the first Executive Mayor of the municipality. In the DA, he was elected chairperson of the DA's East Region in the Western Cape and became a member of the provincial executive committee of the party. Later on, he was elected to the DA's provincial council, the Federal Council, the Federal Executive, and served as deputy federal chairperson.

Swart served as mayor until his election to the National Assembly at the 2004 general election. In November 2006, Swart called for the Public Protector to probe the ongoing mayhem at the Department of Home Affairs. He also said that the department has the "reputation for being the most corrupt department." After his re-election in 2009, the newly elected DA parliamentary leader Athol Trollip appointed him as the DA's spokesperson on the Appropriations Committee and the Shadow Deputy Minister of Finance. In a shadow cabinet reshuffle in September 2010, Kobus Marais was appointed to succeed him as Shadow Deputy Minister of Finance. He was reappointed by the newly appointed DA parliamentary leader, Lindiwe Mazibuko, as the DA's spokesperson on appropriations  in February 2012.

Ahead of the 2014 general election, Swart announced that he would be standing down as an MP and retiring from politics at the election.

Personal life and death
Swart was married to Sannett, and they had three children. They lived in Herolds Bay.

On 8 January 2021, Swart was admitted to hospital in George after he had contracted COVID-19 during the COVID-19 pandemic in South Africa. He was reported as being in a critical condition. He died from the virus on  17 January.

References

1941 births
People from Swellendam
2021 deaths
People from George, South Africa
Afrikaner people
Mayors of places in South Africa
South African businesspeople
21st-century South African politicians
Democratic Alliance (South Africa) politicians
Members of the National Assembly of South Africa
Deaths from the COVID-19 pandemic in South Africa